Am Schöpfwerk  is a station on  of the Vienna U-Bahn. It is located in the Meidling District. It opened on 15 April 1995 as part of the section between Philadelphiabrücke and Siebenhirten.

References

External links 
 

Buildings and structures in Meidling
Railway stations opened in 1995
1995 establishments in Austria
Vienna U-Bahn stations
Railway stations in Austria opened in the 20th century